Michael Schmidt OBE FRSL (born 2 March 1947) is a Mexican-British poet, author, scholar and publisher.

Early life
Born in Mexico City, Mexico, Schmidt was educated at The Hill School from 1959 to 1965 and earned an English-Speaking Union Scholarship to attend Christ's Hospital School (1965–66). He studied at Harvard University and at Wadham College, Oxford University.

Career
Schmidt was Professor of Poetry at Glasgow University until 2014, the Writer in Residence at St. John's College, Cambridge from 2012 to 2015 and a visiting fellow at Trinity College, Cambridge from 2017 to 2018. He is founder (1969) and editorial and managing director of Carcanet Press and a founder (1973) and general editor of PN Review.

A fellow of the Royal Society of Literature, Schmidt received an OBE in 2006 for services to poetry. His literary career has been described as having "a strong sense of internationalism and cultural ‘connectedness’". Schmidt refers to himself in his 1998 book Lives of the Poets as "an Anglophone Mexican publisher".

Schmidt's 2014 book The Novel: A Biography is a loosely chronological history of the development of the novel.  The book aims to explore the relationships between great novelists, including views by other novelists while avoiding literary critics who were not also writers.

In August 2015, Schmidt was one of 20 authors of Poets for Corbyn, an anthology of poems endorsing Jeremy Corbyn's campaign in the  Labour Party leadership election.

Selected bibliography

Poetry
It Was My Tree (Anvil, 1970)
Bedlam and the Oak Wood (Carcanet, 1970)
Desert of the Lions (Carcanet, 1972)
My Brother Gloucester (Carcanet, 1976)
A Change of Affairs (Anvil, 1978)
The Love of Strangers – Poetry Book Society Special Commendation (Century Hutchinson, 1989)
Selected Poems, 1972-1997 – Poetry Book Society Special Commendation (Smith/Doorstop, 1997)
The Resurrection of the Body (USA: Sheep Meadow; Smith/Doorstop, 2007)
Collected Poems (Smith/Doorstop, 2009, Sheep Meadow Press, 2010)
The Stories of My Life (Smith/Doorstop 2013)

Fiction
The Colonist - Los Angeles Times book award (Muller/Hutchinson, 1983; published in USA as Green Island, Vanguard 1984, Dell, 1985)
The Dresden Gate (Century Hutchinson, 1988; Vanguard, 1989)

Criticism
Reading Modern Poetry (London: Routledge, 1989) 
Lives of the Poets (Phoenix, 1998) 
The Story of Poetry: From Cædmon to Caxton; From Skelton to Dryden; From Pope to Burns (three volumes) (2001–2006)
The First Poets: Lives of the Ancient Greek Poets (2004)
The Novel: A Biography (Cambridge, MA: Belknap Press, 2014)
Gilgamesh: The Life of a Poem (Princeton, NJ: Princeton University Press, 2019)

Anthologies

 New Poetries I-VIII (Carcanet, 1994–2018)
 Eleven British Poets (Methuen, 1980)
The Harvill Book of Twentieth-Century Poetry in English (1999, 2005) (editor)
A Calendar of Modern Poetry (PN Review 100, 1994)
The Great Modern Poets(inc audio excerpts) Quercus Poetry, 2006,

References

External links

Biography on Carcanet Press''
Profile on Contemporary Writers
"What, How Well, Why?"—Schmidt's Lecture from StAnza, Scotland's annual poetry festival
Podcast Interview with Schmidt by André Naffis-Sahely''

Living people
1947 births
American male poets
Officers of the Order of the British Empire
Fellows of the Royal Society of Literature
Harvard University alumni
The Hill School alumni
Writers from Mexico City
20th-century American poets
20th-century American male writers